Mroczki-Stylongi is a village in the administrative district of Gmina Szumowo, within Zambrów County, Podlaskie Voivodeship, in north-eastern Poland.

References

Mroczki-Stylongi